The Second Gyurcsány Government took its oath of office on June 9, 2006, following the First Gyurcsány Government in power. This is the seventh government after the regime change. The majority of the government consisted of the Hungarian Socialist Party (MSZP), which won the 2006 elections, and the Alliance of Free Democrats (SZDSZ) until 30 April 2008, when the SZDSZ recalled its ministers and left the coalition. The head of government was Ferenc Gyurcsány (MSZP). On April 14, 2009, the Parliament passed a vote of no confidence against Prime Minister Ferenc Gyurcsány. Since 2006, the Cabinet had suffered from the aftermath of the burnt-out Őszöd speech and the subsequent demonstration series. Nor was it good for the government to try to take control of the crackdown on the protesters by deploying police officers without an identification number, which the national side has since called only the 2006 police terror. The declining GDP debt-to-GDP ratio and the borrowed IMF loan also weighed heavily on the downturn.

Party breakdown

Beginning of term 
Party breakdown of cabinet ministers in the beginning of term:

End of term 
Party breakdown of cabinet ministers in the end of term:

Composition

References 

Hungarian governments
2006 establishments in Hungary
2009 disestablishments in Hungary
Cabinets established in 2006
Cabinets disestablished in 2009
Government 2